Ohio NORML is the National Organization for the Reform of Marijuana Laws affiliate for the U.S. state of Ohio.

In 2015, the chapter's leader, Rob Ryan, was removed from his position for supporting ResponsibleOhio's effort to legalize marijuana.

The organization gave Ohio Governor Mike DeWine an "F" grade, citing DeWine's opposition to the legalization of cannabis "despite the recent enactment of legalization in nearby states."

See also

 Cannabis in Ohio
 List of cannabis organizations

References

External links
 
 

Cannabis in Ohio
Cannabis organizations
National Organization for the Reform of Marijuana Laws
Organizations based in Ohio